Jan-Dirk Nijkamp (born August 11, 1964 in Voorst) is a Dutch sprint canoer who competed in the early 1990s. He competed for the Deventer Kano Vereniging. At the 1992 Summer Olympics in Barcelona, he was eliminated in the repechages of both the K-2 500 m and the K-2 1000 m event. Nijkamp studied ecology and engages in public policy consulting.

Canoeing career 
Nijkamp participated in the World Cup Canoe of 1985 at Hazewinkel in Heindonk, Belgium, of 1990 in Duisburg, Germany, and of 1991 in Paris. In Paris, Nijkamp and his canoe partner Marc Weijzen met the minimum time for the 1992 Summer Olympics. The final decision that Nijkamp and Weijzen could represent the Netherlands in the Olympics was made by Dutch Olympic Committee in June 1992.

References

External links
 Nijkamp's website
 Athlete profile at Sports-Reference.com

1964 births
Living people
People from Voorst
Canoeists at the 1992 Summer Olympics
Dutch male canoeists
Olympic canoeists of the Netherlands
Dutch ecologists
Sportspeople from Gelderland